Hawick Linden RFC are a rugby union team based in Hawick, in the Scottish Borders. In the 2008–09 season, in which they were undefeated, they won all 12 games, they made it to the semi-final of the Scottish Plate. They play their home games at Volunteer Park.

Hawick Linden Sevens
The club organise the annual Hawick Linden Sevens tournament in May every year.

Club internationalists
 Jock Beattie 23 caps
 Adam Robson 22 caps
 George Stevenson 24 caps
 Rob Welsh 2 caps
 Ian Barnes 7 caps
 Alister Campbell 15 caps
 Tony Stanger 52 caps
 Rob Barrie 1 cap
 Billy Hunter 7 caps
 Derek Deans 1 cap
 Graham Hogg 2 caps
 Jim Hay 1 cap
 Nikki Walker
 Conor Gracie

Honours
 Hawick Linden Sevens
 Champions (1): 2015
 Selkirk Junior Sevens
 Champions (1): 1993, 1996
 Langholm Junior Sevens
 Champions (1): 1927, 1952, 1960, 1969, 1981
 Dumfries Sevens
 Champions (1): 1960, 1965, 1966, 1967, 1968, 1969, 1976, 1995
 South of Scotland District Sevens
 Champions (1): 1966, 1969, 1978, 1983, 1996
 North Berwick Sevens
 Champions (1): 1975, 1983

Current squad

References

External links
Hawick Linden website

Scottish rugby union teams
Rugby union clubs in the Scottish Borders
Hawick
Rugby clubs established in 1921
1921 establishments in Scotland